“Kat Maconie” (born 5 February 1984) is a London based footwear designer who started her own label in 2009. Her luxury footwear incorporates structural heels, atop unique embroidered and embellished designs that have become a signature. She has partnered with other organisations for projects including limited edition pieces and pop up cocktail bars. Her company has since branched out into handbags and jewellery.

Life
Maconie was born in London and she attended the London College of Fashion.

After two years at Whistles, working on buying and product development, Kat Maconie moved into fashion recruitment and began creating her label part-time in a tiny west studio. . Kat Maconie shoes reflect bold colours, strong prints, architectural shapes and metallic details. Kat has also collaborated with high street brands like Dune and fashion designers such as Felder Felder or Fyodor Golan creating shoes for their catwalk shows at London Fashion Week  Her shoes are now stocked in twenty countries and in leading online stores such as Nordstrom and Level Shoes. Her signature block heels with gold frames and city sandals help her to win Drapers Shoe Designer of the Year award in 2013.

In 2013 the brand secured an investment from venture capital trust Pembroke that includes Next chief executive Lord Wolfson among it's investors. Maconie plans to use the investment to expand her main collections, expand the sales and marketing team and relaunch the brands website, KatMaconie.com.

Shoes 
Maconie is renowned for injecting fun into the luxurious. Designed in London, the colourful, playful and bold shoe brand has become the leader of a new generation of footwear brands. Focusing on eye-catching and unique sculptural heels, the brand has built a strong design aesthetic that has started to become recognisable worldwide. Adored by the likes of Taylor Swift, Maya Jama, Amelia Dimoldenberg, Sidney Sweeney and Addison Rae to name a few.

Projects 
In 2019, Maconie launched a collaborative footwear project with the Pink Panther, releasing exclusive designs incorporating the nostalgic 60s character. Kat has also collaborated with runway designers, Ashley Williams and Teatum Jones, creating exuberant designs to pair with their collections.

Stores 
In January 2019, the company opened their first UK flagship store, in the close-to-home Bermondsey Street, up from the iconic Tower Bridge. The company has plans to expand their bricks and mortar presence, hoping to open more retail stores in the near future.

References

Designers from London
Shoe companies of the United Kingdom